Staré Křečany is a municipality and village in Děčín District in the Ústí nad Labem Region of the Czech Republic. It has about 1,200 inhabitants.

Administrative parts
Villages of Brtníky, Kopec, Nové Křečany, Panský and Valdek are administrative parts of Staré Křečany.

Gallery

References

Villages in Děčín District